Capotille is a commune in the Ouanaminthe Arrondissement, in the Nord-Est department of Haiti. It has 15,086 inhabitants and is adjacent to the Dominican Republic–Haiti border.

Communal Sections 
The commune consists of two communal sections, namely:
 Capotille, urban and rural, contains the town of Capotille
 Lamine, rural

References

Populated places in Nord-Est (department)
Communes of Haiti